E. A. Smith may refer to:

E. A. Smith (company), Norwegian trading company
E. A. Smith (historian), English historian
Edgar Albert Smith (1847–1916), British malacologist and zoologist
Eugene Allen Smith (1841–1927), geologist from the USA
Effie Anderson Smith (1869-1955), Impressionist painter active mostly in Arizona, USA

See also
List of people with surname Smith#E

no:E. A. Smith